Marmion may refer to:

People
 Marmion (surname), including a list of people with the name
 Baron Marmion, four different baronies held by the Marmion family

Places
 Marmion, Western Australia, a suburb of Perth
Marmion Land District
Electoral district of Marmion
 Marmion Academy, a college-preparatory high school in Aurora, Illinois, USA
 Marmion Lake, Canada
 Marmion Tower, West Tanfield, North Yorkshire
 Fontenay-le-Marmion, a commune in France

Other uses
 Marmion (poem), an epic poem by Walter Scott about the Battle of Flodden
 Marmion (Comorn, Virginia), U.S., a historic house
 , two ships of the Royal Navy

See also

 Marmion Abbey, a Benedictine community of the Swiss-American Congregation in Aurora, Illinois, U.S.
 Marmion Academy, a Catholic high school in Illinois